Ornithocheiroidea (or ornithocheiroids) is a group of pterosaurs within the extinct suborder Pterodactyloidea. They were typically large pterosaurs that lived from the Early to Late Cretaceous periods (Valanginian to Maastrichtian stages), with fossil remains found all over the world except Antarctica.

Ornithocheiroids were the most advanced group of pterosaurs, as the group includes the clade Azhdarchoidea, of which its members lived until the Maastrichtian stage of the Late Cretaceous, around 66 million years ago. Notable pterosaurs from this group include the pteranodontians Pteranodon and Nyctosaurus, the ornithocheirid Ornithocheirus, the anhanguerid Tropeognathus, as well as the azhdarchids Hatzegopteryx and Quetzalcoatlus.

Classification
The name Ornithocheiroidea was originally defined as an apomorphy-based taxon by Christopher Bennett in 1994. It was given a relationship-based definition in 2003 by Alexander Kellner, who defined it as the least inclusive clade containing Anhanguera blittersdorffi, Pteranodon longiceps, Dsungaripterus weii, and Quetzalcoatlus northropi. Later that year, David Unwin suggested a more restrictive definition, in which the clade only contains Pteranodon longiceps, Istiodactylus latidens, and their descentants. Brian Andres (2008, 2010, 2014) in his analyses, defined Ornithocheiroidea using the definition of Kellner (2003) to avoid confusion with similarly-defined groups, like Pteranodontoidea.

Below is a cladogram showing the results of a phylogenetic analysis presented by Longrich and colleagues in 2018. They found Ornithocheiroidea to consist of the clades Pteranodontoidea and Azhdarchoidea, as well as the genus Piksi.

In 2019, a phylogenetic analysis conducted by Kellner and colleagues had recovered Ornithocheiroidea as the sister taxon of the Archaeopterodactyloidea, and consisting of the clades Tapejaroidea and Pteranodontoidea. Several recent studies have followed this or a similar concept. The cladogram of the analysis by Kellner and colleagues is presented below:

References

 
Early Cretaceous first appearances
Maastrichtian extinctions